"Like Clockwork" is a single by The Boomtown Rats. It was the band's first to reach the Top Ten in the UK Singles Chart, peaking at No. 6.

Described as "simple, cool", in concerts supporting A Tonic for the Troops, the song's agitated, staccato bassline made it a common show opener.  The B-side, "How Do You Do?" was a fast-paced punk/new-wave song, in the mould of the band's earlier work. However, the Irish version of the single, released on Mulligan Records, substituted the B-side with "D.U.N L.A.O.G.H.A.I.R.E", a tongue in cheek samba, discussing the spelling of the band's home town, written Dún Laoghaire but pronounced Dunleary. The latter was later released in the UK as a free flexi disc, distributed by Flexipop in January 1981. "Like Clockwork" was the first song on air broadcast on RTÉ Radio 2, when the station began broadcasting on 31 May 1979, played by Larry Gogan.

Personnel
 Bob Geldof – vocals, saxophone
 Pete Briquette – bass, vocals
 Gerry Cott – guitar
 Johnnie Fingers – keyboards, vocals
 Simon Crowe – drums, vocals
 Garry Roberts – guitar, vocals

References

1978 singles
The Boomtown Rats songs
Song recordings produced by Robert John "Mutt" Lange
Songs written by Bob Geldof
Songs written by Pete Briquette
1978 songs
Ensign Records singles
Columbia Records singles